The 1940 Campeonato Paulista da Primeira Divisão, organized by the LFESP (Liga de Futebol do Estado de São Paulo), was the 39th season of São Paulo's top professional football league. Palestra Itália won the title for the 8th time. no teams were relegated and the top scorer was Ypiranga's Peixe with 21 goals.

Championship
The championship was disputed in a double-round robin system, with the team with the most points winning the title.

Top Scorers

References

Campeonato Paulista seasons
Paulista